John Crump (born 31 July 1940) is a British former tennis player.

Crump, a Surrey county player, competed at Wimbledon during the 1960s and 1970s, making it as far as the third round in doubles. He later worked as a tennis manager for sports manufacturing company Dunlop.

References

External links
 
 

1940 births
Living people
British male tennis players
English male tennis players
Tennis people from Surrey